The speckled boobook, also called the Oriental hawk-owl, (Ninox punctulata) is a small owl at . It is a reddish-brown hawk-owl with a white-spotted head, back and wings, a white throat patch, black facial disk, and white eyebrows.

This owl is found on the island of Sulawesi in Indonesia and lives mainly in forests near streams, open woodland, and cultivated regions with scattered trees. It is mainly found at altitudes lower than 1100 meters, but is occasionally seen at up to  asl. It is fairly common throughout its range.

References

External links 
 BirdLife Species Factsheet
 The Owl Pages

Ninox
Endemic birds of Sulawesi
Birds described in 1830
Taxa named by Jean René Constant Quoy
Taxa named by Joseph Paul Gaimard